Blewford was a community in Harmon Township, Washington County, Arkansas, United States. It is located within the Ozark National Forest approximately one quarter mile east of Litteral Road and the Benton County line. US Route 412 is approximately one mile to the north.

A post office existed from approximately 1899 to 1902.

References

Geography of Washington County, Arkansas
Ghost towns in Arkansas
Populated places established in 1899
1899 establishments in Arkansas